Sant is a sum (district) of Selenge Province in northern Mongolia. In 2008, its population was 2,056.

References 

Populated places in Mongolia
Districts of Selenge Province